Oxypolis is a small genus of North American flowering plants in the carrot family known as cowbane, water dropwort, dropwort, hog-fennel, and pig-potato. , Kew's Plants of the World Online accepts four species in the genus Oxypolis:

Oxypolis fendleri 
Oxypolis occidentalis 
Oxypolis rigidior 
Oxypolis ternata

References

Apioideae
Apioideae genera